"Someone to Watch Over Me" is a 1926 song composed by George Gershwin with lyrics by Ira Gershwin, assisted by Howard Dietz who penned the title. It was written for the musical Oh, Kay! (1926), with the part originally sung on Broadway by English actress Gertrude Lawrence while holding a rag doll in a sentimental solo scene. The musical ran for more than 200 performances in New York and then saw equivalent acclaim in London in 1927, all with the song as its centerpiece. Lawrence released the song as a medium-tempo single which rose to #2 on the charts in 1927.

Origin
Initially, "Someone to Watch Over Me" was written by George Gershwin for the musical Oh, Kay! as a "fast and jazzy" up-tempo rhythm tune – marked scherzando (playful) in the sheet music – but in the 1930s and 1940s it was recorded by singers in a slower ballad form, which became the standard. The definitive slow torch song version was first released by Lee Wiley in 1939, followed by Margaret Whiting in 1944.

Howard Dietz, who was involved in composing other songs in Oh Kay! while Ira Gershwin was hospitalized for six weeks for a ruptured appendix, claimed he helped write the lyrics to "Someone to Watch Over Me". He was not named in the song credits, and he was paid very little for his contribution. Dietz said in his 1974 memoir that the song's title was his idea, a fact first revealed by Ira in his 1959 book Lyrics on Several Occasions.

Lawrence's performances of the song in 1926 and 1927 were presented in a solo scene at the beginning of Act II with Lawrence wearing a maid's uniform and singing to a rag doll that she held in her hand. The rag doll was described in male gender terms by George Gershwin in 1934, saying "I don't know where he is now... He certainly did his part well." Gershwin said he found the doll in a toy shop in Philadelphia, where the play was in development, and he gave it to Lawrence to use as a prop in the scene, to increase the sense of her character's vulnerability. This late addition surprised the play's director.

Recordings and features
The song was recorded by Frank Sinatra in 1946 for his first album The Voice of Frank Sinatra, and again in 1954 for the film Young At Heart. Sinatra's popular recordings helped cement the standard slow style. "Someone to Watch Over Me" was notably covered by Ella Fitzgerald (1950 and 1959), Blossom Dearie (1952), Chet Baker (1955), Sarah Vaughan (1957), Dakota Staton (1960), Barbra Streisand (1965), Ray Charles (1969), Willie Nelson (1978), Sting (1987), Rickie Lee Jones (2000), Elton John (2002) and Amy Winehouse (2008). Nelson Riddle arranged two lush orchestral versions, one backing Keely Smith in 1959 on Swingin' Pretty, and the other for Linda Ronstadt in 1983 on What's New – the latter album winning a Grammy Award. The song was also used prominently in the film Mr. Holland's Opus (1995) with vocals by Jean Louisa Kelly in the film and Julia Fordham on the film's soundtrack.

More than 1,800 recordings of the song have been released, almost all of them in the slow ballad style.

See also 
List of 1920s jazz standards
The play Someone Who'll Watch Over Me by poet Frank McGuinness.

References

Further reading
 

1926 songs
1920s jazz standards
Pop standards
Songs from musicals
Songs with music by George Gershwin
Songs with lyrics by Ira Gershwin
Torch songs
Victor Talking Machine Company singles